Dean Elgar (born 11 June 1987) is a South African cricketer who plays Tests and ODIs, and former Test captain. He is a left-handed opening batter and a slow-left arm bowler.

Elgar captained the 2006 Under-19 Cricket World Cup in Sri Lanka in 2006. He now plays for the Northerns cricket team and Titans cricket team in the major South African cricket competitions. He was included in the Northerns team for the 2015 Africa T20 Cup. On 23 March 2018, he became the second batsman after Desmond Haynes to carry his bat through an innings on three occasions in Test cricket history.

In March 2021, Cricket South Africa announced that Elgar had been appointed as South Africa's Test captain, taking over the role from Quinton de Kock.

International career

Debut years
Elgar was selected for the Sri Lankan ODI series in early 2012 but had to withdraw citing injury. He eventually made his ODI debut against England in a rain-abandoned match, but found success in his second match, scoring 15 in his maiden innings before being bowled by Graeme Swann. Bowling his left-arm spin, Elgar had Craig Kieswetter caught out off only his third delivery in ODI Cricket. In the field, Elgar took an  incredible catch of Jonathan Trott then caught Eoin Morgan out in a South African victory.

Elgar made his test debut against Australia on 30 November 2012 and scored a duck in his maiden test innings. He followed this with another duck in the second innings to complete a pair of ducks on debut. On 12 January 2013, Elgar scored his maiden test century against New Zealand. The retirement of Graeme Smith created a regular opportunity for Elgar in his specialist position at the top of the order in Test cricket.

Elgar made 103, against Sri Lanka on 16 July 2014, and followed up with 121 against West Indies at St George's Oval, a ground where he scored almost half of his career international test runs, and recorded the most fifties.

Record opener
On 28 December 2015, Elgar became the first South African opener to carry his bat in a Test innings since Gary Kirsten in 1997, when he finished 118 not out against England.

On 5 November 2016, Elgar scored 127 during the first Test against Australia at Perth. The partnership of 250 by himself and JP Duminy in the match was recorded as South Africa's highest partnership in Perth, the third highest overall in Perth, and their second highest against Australia.

On 11 March 2017, against New Zealand he became the first South African opener to face 200 or more balls in both innings of a Test.
 
On 27 January 2018, against India Elgar became the first South African to carry his bat twice in Tests since 1992.

On 23 March 2018, Elgar carried the bat for the third time in his test career scoring an unbeaten 141 against Australia when South Africa was bowled out for 311 in the first innings of the 3rd test, equalling the record with Desmond Haynes of West Indies. With this achievement, he also became the only batsman to carry his bat in an innings of a test match twice in a single calendar year.

Captaincy

Elgar stood in for regular Test captain Faf du Plessis when he missed the first Test against England in 2017, following the birth of his first child. In January 2019, during Pakistan series, South Africa's captain Faf du Plessis was penalised for a slow over-rate in the second Test and was suspended for the third and final Test of the series. Elgar was named as the stand-in captain for the third Test. He took over as full-time test captain, following the resignation of Quinton de Kock from the position. His first test as captain came against the West Indies in June 2021. South Africa won this match by an innings and 63 runs and then won the following test by 158 runs, giving Elgar a 2–0 victory in his debut series as captain. In January 2022, during the 2021-22 Indian tour of South Africa Elgar scored an unbeaten 96 in the second test to guide South Africa to a seven wicket victory and draw the series level.

Domestic and franchise cricket
In September 2019, Elgar was named in the squad for the Tshwane Spartans team for the 2019 Mzansi Super League tournament. In April 2021, he was named in Northerns' squad, ahead of the 2021–22 cricket season in South Africa. In February 2022, Elgar was named as the captain of the Titans for the 2021–22 CSA T20 Challenge.

List of international centuries
Elgar has scored 13 centuries (100 or more runs in a single innings) in Test. Elgar made his Test debut against Australis at the Waca, Perth in November 2012. His highest Test score of 199 came against Bangladesh at the Senwes Park, Potchefstroom in September 2018. He has not scored any century in One Day International (ODI) matches or Twenty20 International (T20I) matches.

See also
 List of cricketers who have carried the bat in international cricket

References

External links
 
 Dean Elgar's profile page on Wisden

1987 births
Living people
Sportspeople from Welkom
South African cricketers
Free State cricketers
Knights cricketers
South Africa Test cricketers
South Africa One Day International cricketers
Somerset cricketers
Surrey cricketers
Titans cricketers
Tshwane Spartans cricketers